Shailaja Kumar (born 17 January 1967) is an Indian female Alpine Skier. She competed at the 1988 Winter Olympics. She is the first Indian woman to participate at the Winter Olympics.

Alpine skiing results
All results are sourced from the International Ski Federation (FIS).

Olympic results

See also 
 India at the 1988 Winter Olympics

References

External links
 

1967 births
Living people
Sportswomen from Delhi
Indian female alpine skiers
Olympic alpine skiers of India
Alpine skiers at the 1988 Winter Olympics